Bassiouni is a surname. Notable people with the surname include:

 M. Cherif Bassiouni (1937–2017), Egyptian-born American scholar of law and human rights expert
 Mohammed Bassiouni ( 1937–2011), Egyptian military officer and diplomat